The surname Cuyp (sometimes spelled Kuyp) is shared by three painters who lived during the Dutch Golden Age:
 Jacob Gerritsz. Cuyp (1594–1651 or 1652)
 his half-brother Benjamin Gerritsz Cuyp (1612–1652)
 Jacob's son Aelbert Cuyp (1620–1691), the most famous of the three

References
Murray, P. & L. (1997). The Penguin dictionary of art and artists (7th ed.). London: Penguin Books. .

Dutch families
Lists of people by surname